Daniel Valenzuela (born May 5, 1956, in Misiones, Argentina), is a prolific film and television actor.  He has also done some screenplay writing. He works in the cinema of Argentina.

Three of his most recent roles were in critically acclaimed films: La Ciénaga (2001), A Red Bear (2002), and Chronicle of an Escape (2006).

Filmography (partial)
 Mala época (1998)
 Antigua vida mía (2001) a.k.a. Antigua, My Life
 La Ciénaga (2001) a.k.a. The Swamp
 El Juego de la silla (2002) a.k.a. Musical Chairs
 Dibu 3 (2002)
 Un Oso Rojo (2002) a.k.a. A Red Bear
 Vivir Intentando (2003)
 El Fondo del Mar (2003) a.k.a. The Bottom of the Sea
 Buenos Aires 100 kilómetros (2004)
 Navidad en el placard (2004)
 Tiempo de valientes (2005)
 Nordeste (2005)
 El Boquete (2006)
 Crónica de una fuga (2006) a.k.a. Chronicle of an Escape

Television (partial)
 Tumberos (2002) (Mini TV Series) a.k.a. Tombers
 Ventdelplà (1 episode, 2006)

Screenplays
 El Bonaerense (2002)
 Fué (2006)

Footnotes

External links
 

1956 births
Argentine male film actors
Argentine male television actors
Argentine screenwriters
Male screenwriters
Argentine male writers
Living people